Clarence Park (formerly Goodwood South) is an inner southern suburb of Adelaide, South Australia in the City of Unley. Its borders are Mills Street (north), Goodwood Road (east), Cross Road (south) and the Seaford railway line (north-west).

History
Goodwood Park Post Office opened on 27 December 1877, was renamed Goodwood South in 1884, Clarence Park in 1910 and was replaced by a new Cumberland Park office in 1993.

Facilities
The Clarence Park Community Centre is located just over the train line on East Avenue, in the suburb of Black Forest. The centre caters for many clubs, provides courses, and is adjacent to the Clarence Park Biodiversity Garden. Clarence Park Community Kindergarten is located on Parker Terrace in Clarence Park, offering kindergarten and playgroup to the local community.

References

External links
 City of Unley website

Suburbs of Adelaide
Populated places established in 1892